Alikhani may refer to:

Alikhani (surname), list of people with the surname
Alikhani, Iran, a village in Kermanshah Province, Iran
Alikhani, Hormozgan, a village in Hormozgan Province, Iran

See also
Mehr Alikhani, a village in Lorestan Province, Iran
Aha Khani, a village in Hormozgan Province, Iran